Mary Little Cooper (born August 13, 1946) is an inactive Senior United States district judge of the United States District Court for the District of New Jersey.

Education and career

Born in Fond du Lac, Wisconsin, Cooper received an Artium Baccalaureus degree from Bryn Mawr College in 1968 and a Juris Doctor from Villanova University School of Law in 1972. She was in private practice in Newark, New Jersey from 1972 to 1984. She was a Commissioner, New Jersey Department of Banking in Trenton, New Jersey from 1984 to 1990, and was then vice-president and general counsel for Prudential Property and Casualty Insurance in Holmdel, New Jersey, from 1990 to 1992.

Federal judicial service

On July 26, 1991, Cooper was nominated by President George H. W. Bush to a new seat on the United States District Court for the District of New Jersey created by 104 Stat. 5089. She was confirmed by the United States Senate on February 27, 1992, and received her commission on March 2, 1992. She assumed senior status on August 31, 2011. She was confirmed and served on the court until February 26, 1998, under the name of Mary Little Parell.

References

Sources

1946 births
Living people
Bryn Mawr College alumni
Villanova University School of Law alumni
Judges of the United States District Court for the District of New Jersey
United States district court judges appointed by George H. W. Bush
20th-century American judges
21st-century American judges
20th-century American women judges
21st-century American women judges